Humaitá is a municipality in the state of Rio Grande do Sul, Brazil.

It occupies an area of 135.246 km². Its population is 4,736 (2020 est.).

See also
List of municipalities in Rio Grande do Sul

References

Municipalities in Rio Grande do Sul